Madras Kadiravelu Saroja, is an Indian classical dancer, known for her expertise, as an exponent and as a teacher, in the classical dance form of Bharatanatyam. The Government of India honored her, in 2011, with the Padma Shri, the fourth highest civilian award, for her services to the field of art and culture.

Biography

M. K. Saroja was born on 7 April 1931 at Chennai (erstwhile Madras), in the Indian state of Tamil Nadu. She started learning classical dance when she was five years old, along with her sister, under the tutelage of Muthukumaran Pillai, a known classical dance teacher and reportedly, the first dance teacher at Rukmini Devi Arundale's Kalakshetra, who taught many renowned classical dancers such as Mrinalini Sarabhai and Kamala Laxman. The young Saroja followed the master when he moved to Bangalore to join the Bangalore Studio, in Bangalore.

Saroja made her debut in 1940 and soon became a known dancer. In 1946, she was offered a movie contract by Gemini Studios, in Chennai which she turned down. Three years later, in December 1949, she married Mohan Khokar, renowned art historian and dance scholar and a co-student at Kalakshetra and followed her husband to Baroda when he was posted there as the Head of Department of Dance, Maharaja Sayajirao University. In Baroda, Saroja learnt Kathak from Sundarlal and Kundanlal Gangani, noted Kathak gurus.

In 1961, Mohan Khokar was posted as the Special Officer for dance at the Sangeet Natak Akademi and the couple moved to New Delhi. There, she resumed teaching and continued with dance performances and had the opportunity to perform at the Rashtrapati Bhavan, in front of the visiting Saudi Arabian ruler. From 1970 onwards, she started visiting the Centre Mandapa in Paris, for teaching students there which she continued until the year 2000.

M. K. Saroja retired from professional dance, after 40 active years, in 2000, following the death of her husband. She has four sons of which the third son, Ashish Mohan Khokar is a known art historian, author and dance critic. She currently lives in Chennai.

Legacy

The legacy of M. K. Saroja remains the purity she brought into the bharatanatyam and lives through the numerous students she has tutored to fame such as Nargis Katpitia, Pratibha Pandit, Sudha Patel, Laxmi Valrani, Indrani Rehman, Yamini Krishnamurthy, Romana Agnel, Shobana Radhakrishna, Rasika Khanna, Arup Ghosh, Lucia Maloney, Milena Salvini and Vidya. The last two dancers still teaches at the Centre Mandapa, Paris.

Two documentary films have been made on M. K. Saroja, one by the Department of Theatre, University of Rome and another one by Claude Lamorrise.

Awards and recognitions
 Padma Shri - Government of India - 2011
 Sangeet Natak Akademi Tagore Ratna - 2011
 Sangeet Natak Akademi Award - 1995
  Kalaimamani Award - Tamil Nadu State Eyal Isai Nataka Manram
 Natya Kalanidhi - Association of Bharatanatyam Artistes of India - 2007
 Life Time Achievement Award - 
 E. Krishna Iyer Medal - Sruthi Foundation - 2000

See also

 Kalakshetra
 Rukmini Devi Arundale
 Yamini Krishnamurthy
 Indrani Rehman

References

Further reading

External links
 Profile on Narthaki.com

1931 births
Living people
Recipients of the Padma Shri in arts
Performers of Indian classical dance
Artists from Chennai
Recipients of the Kalaimamani Award
Recipients of the Sangeet Natak Akademi Award
Indian female classical dancers
Indian dance teachers
Teachers of Indian classical dance
Bharatanatyam exponents
20th-century Indian dancers
20th-century Indian women artists
Dancers from Tamil Nadu
Women educators from Tamil Nadu
20th-century Indian educators
Women artists from Tamil Nadu
Educators from Tamil Nadu
20th-century women educators